Botelloides glomerosus is a species of sea snail, a marine gastropod mollusk in the family Trochidae, the top snails.

Description
The size of the shell varies between 2.9 mm and 6 mm. The shell is small, solid, glossy, columnar, and blunt at either end. Its colour is milk-white to pale ochre, yellow at the summit. The shell consists of five whorls. The first three are turbinate, the last two-thirds of the shell's total length. They are slightly inflated, contracted at the sutures and  wound obliquely.

Sculpture: the top whorls are smooth, last two ornamented by fine flat-topped spiral riblets parted by shallow grooves of slightly greater breadth. The riblets are more crowded on the centre of the whorl. There are 20 on the last whorl and 10 on the antepenultimate whorl. Faint growth-striae cross riblets and grooves obliquely. The aperture is round, bevelled at the edge, and thickened within but not externally.

Distribution
This marine species is endemic to Australia and occurs off Northern Territory, Western Australia and Queensland

References

 Ponder, W.F. 1985. A revision of the genus Botelloides (Mollusca: Gastropoda: Trochacea). Department of Mines and Energy, South Australia, Special Publication 5: 301-327 p. 305, pl. 1,fig. 6, pl. 5, figs 1-4, pl. 7, fig. 1
 Wilson, B. 1993. Australian Marine Shells. Prosobranch Gastropods. Kallaroo, Western Australia : Odyssey Publishing Vol. 1 408 pp

External links
 To World Register of Marine Species

glomerosus
Gastropods of Australia
Gastropods described in 1907